The 1924 season was the 41st season of regional competitive association football in Australia.

National teams

Australia men's national soccer team

Results and fixtures

Friendlies

League competitions

Cup competitions

(Note: figures in parentheses display the club's competition record as winners/runners-up.)

See also
 Soccer in Australia

References

Seasons in Australian soccer
1924 in Australian sport
Australian soccer by year
Australian soccer